Tudhaliya IV was a king of the Hittite Empire (New kingdom), and the younger son of Hattusili III. He reigned c. 1245–1215 BC (middle chronology) or c. 1237–1209 BC (short chronology). His mother was the great queen, Puduhepa.

Biography 
Tudhaliya was likely born in his father's court in Hattusa, after his brother and crown prince Nerikkaili, but still while their father was governing on his brother Muwatalli II's behalf. He was a good friend of Muwatalli's son, Kurunta, and Hattusili ordered that they stay on good terms.

After Hattusili as King wrote up a treaty with "Ulmi-Tessup" which confirmed Kurunta's rule over Tarhuntassa, Hattusili elevated Tudhaliya over his older brother to be his crown prince. Tudhaliya as king drew up a bronze tablet treaty confirming the links between him and Kurunta. During his reign, 13 dams were built after a severe drought, one of which still survives to this day at Alacahöyük.

He suffered a severe defeat at the hands of Tukulti-Ninurta I of Assyria in the Battle of Nihriya, c. 1237 BC.

Tudhaliya had a sister, queen Maathorneferure of Egypt.  He had two sons, who were the last two kings of the Hittites before their empire fell probably due to the Sea People.

See also

 History of the Hittites

References

External links

Reign of Tudhaliya IV

Hittite kings
13th-century BC rulers